Jens Kroker (born 4 July 1968) is a German sailor from Berlin who competed in three Paralympics games winning gold in 2008 and silver medal in 2012 in the Sonar Class. Both medals were achieved with skipper Jens Kroker and fellow crew member Robert Prem.

References

External links
 
 

1968 births
Living people
German disabled sportspeople
German male sailors (sport)
Paralympic sailors of Germany
Paralympic medalists in sailing
Paralympic gold medalists for Germany
Paralympic silver medalists for Germany
Sailors at the 2008 Summer Paralympics
Sailors at the 2012 Summer Paralympics
Sailors at the 2016 Summer Paralympics